Clara Bindi (born 1 November 1927) is an Italian actress.

Biography
Born in Naples, Bindi joined the Eduardo De Filippo theater company in the 1947-48 season and in 1948 made her film debut as Giulietta Del Bello in La macchina ammazzacattivi, directed by Roberto Rossellini. She was a member of the De Filippo company for several years, even appearing in numerous television adaptations of his plays.

She was in over fifty films between 1948 and 2013 and is best known for her work in the films, La Maschera del Demonio (1960), L'amico di famiglia (2006), and Signorina Effe (2007). Starting from the 1990s, she specialized in roles of mother and grandmother. Outside her film and television appearances, Bindi was essentially a revue and dialect theater actress. She was also active as a voice actress and a dubber.

Described as full of temperament and highly communicative, she was married to actor Aldo Bufi Landi, with whom she often worked on stage.

Selected filmography

Notes

References

External links 
 
 
 
 

1927 births
Italian film actresses
20th-century Italian actresses
Actresses from Naples
Living people